The Singapore Alliance Party, or simply the Singapore Alliance, was a political coalition formed on 2 June 1961 that contested several elections in Singapore, notably the 1955 Elections of Singapore and the 1963 Elections of Singapore. It consisted of the local branch of the United Malays National Organisation (UMNO), the Malay Union, the local chapters of the Malayan Chinese Association and the Malayan Indian Congress, and former Chief Minister Lim Yew Hock's Singapore People's Alliance (SPA).

This alliance was formalised on 24 June 1963 as the Singaporean component of the ruling Alliance Party in Malaya. Its campaign policy during the 1963 elections was similar to what the UMNO used in federal elections in Malaysia, and alleged the ruling People's Action Party (PAP) mistreated the Malays, one of the major races in Singapore. While the Singapore Alliance also supported merger within the Federation of Malaysia and was anti-Communist, it sought to extend the same model of communal politics on the mainland to Singapore. Unlike the then-left-leaning and socialist PAP, it was identified with the political right.

Throughout its history, the Singapore Alliance has only held seven seats with the SPA holding four seats and the Singapore United Malay National Organization occupying three seats in Malay-dominated areas like Geylang Serai, Kampong Kembangan, and the Southern Islands. During the 1963 general election, the Alliance performed poorly and lost all its seats. Its participation in the 1963 election further heightened tensions between UMNO and the PAP as they had earlier agreed neither side would participate in each other's elections until Malaysia, which Singapore was then an autonomous state of, was more mature.

After the 1963 elections, the Singapore Alliance was left in the political wilderness. While the coalition was briefly reformed and re-registered as the "Alliance Party Singapura" in 1966, it did contest any future elections in Singapore and gradually faded from the political scene. Most of its component parties eventually ceased to operate with the exception of Pertubuhan Kebangsaan Melayu Singapura, which subsequently joined the Singapore Democratic Alliance.

References

Further reading

Background of Singapore Alliance

1963 establishments in Singapore
Anti-communist parties
Defunct political parties in Singapore
Political parties established in 1963